In a case competition, participants strive to develop the best solution to a business or education-related case study within an allocated time frame, typically with teams of two or more individuals pitted against each other in a head-to-head or broader relative ranking. Teams deliver presentations for judges and, while competitions vary in composition, a standard format and purpose exists. In terms of cumulative number of participants, the HSBC/HKU Asia Pacific Business Case Competition is the world's largest case competition, with over 130,000 participants since 2008.

History 
The case competition concept originated in the United States and originally included participants from domestic universities. The notion of expanding to include international competitors emerged later, with the concept eventually taking hold across North America and Western Europe. Today, a wide range of international competitions are hosted in various countries in North America, Europe, and Asia. International case competitions have also begun expanding beyond the undergraduate level, as competitions like the Wharton China Business Society International Case Competition offer high school divisions.

Format

Formats vary according to a number of dimensions. The following dimensions are often used to classify and compare competitions: Host: corporate versus educational institution; Participant selection: "by invitation" versus "by application"; and, Level: undergraduate, graduate. Formats may vary along practical dimensions, including: Case specificity (whether the case has been written especially for the competition or not); Number of teams; Organization (student-run, professional etc.); Rules, e.g.:Time (common formats are 3-4 or 24 hours), Materials, Degree of access to expert advice (either from within the competition or externally, and electronically or face to face).

Some competitions add complexity to create a more interesting challenge. For example, Ohio State University (OSU)'s Center for International Business Education And Research (CIBER), in its annual Case Challenge, created teams from the overall pool of participants, regardless of school, dissolving the usual school-based team format. For the Ohio State scenario, once the students are assigned to teams, a full day of team-building exercises is run for competitors.

Competitions can be internal to a business school, or they can involve teams from multiple schools. Sometimes the competition includes several rounds, with the final round typically judged by outside company executives (sometimes the panel consists of executives from the actual company in the case). For example, the University of Washington’s Foster School of Business' 2010 round of its Global Business Case Competition featured a customized case on the Boeing Company, and Boeing executives acted as judges.

Participation
Participants exercise skills and knowledge on a "real world" case for an actual organization, with the support of representatives who can provide professional advice. Other competitions select an issue based on its degree of importance, and employ the competition as a means to both highlight the issue and create potential solutions through the efforts of the competitors. Participants can also be assessed as potential candidates for analysis-based jobs within the targeted companies.

Teams in case competitions are tasked with assessing the situation facing the organization, analyzing available information, crafting a solution, and defending their recommendations. In general, teams adhere to a time limit and specific rules. Each team is judged independently, and the judges' decision is final, although a confidential summary evaluation is generally provided.

Notable competitions

Invitational competitions

Competitions by application 
APEX Business-IT Global Case Challenge, Singapore Management University
Inter-Collegiate Business Competition, Queen's School of Business
Aarhus Case Competition, Aarhus University

References 

Business education
Student events
Management theory